Keith Brown (born 23 September 1954) is an English professional footballer who played as a winger.

References

1954 births
Living people
Footballers from Grimsby
English footballers
Association football wingers
Nottingham Forest F.C. players
Grimsby Town F.C. players
Louth United F.C. players
English Football League players